Kurkov is a Slavic masculine surname, its feminine counterpart is Kurkova. The surname is commonly found in the Russian, Ukrainian and Czech languages.

Andrey Kurkov (born 1961), Ukrainian novelist
Karolína Kurková (born 1984), Czech model
Petra Kurková (born 1973), Czech skier
Ravshana Kurkova (born 1980), Uzbek and Russian actor
Věra Kůrková (born 1948), Czech computer scientist

Russian-language surnames